The 2009 Wuzhou International Group Jiangsu Classic was a professional non-ranking snooker tournament that took place between 4–7 June 2009 at the Wuxi Sports Center in Wuxi, China. The round-robin stage consisted of two groups of six players, ten top 16 players. The tournament was renamed the following year to Wuxi Classic.

Mark Selby made the 69th official maximum break during his last round robin match against Joe Perry. This was Selby's first official 147 break.

Mark Allen won his first professional title by defeating defending champion Ding Junhui 6–0.

Prize fund
The breakdown of prize money for this year is shown below:
Winner: £20,000
Runner-Up: £9,000
Semi-finalist: £8,000
3rd place in Group: £4,000
4th place in Group: £2,000
Appearance Fees for professionals: £2,500
Highest Break: £1,000

Round robin stage

Group 1

(breaks above 50 shown between brackets)breaks 100 and above will be indicated bold.

 Ding Junhui 1–2 Li Hang → 29–47, (117) 118–12, 38–73 (65)
 Mark Allen 2–0 Stephen Hendry → (60) 77–40, 65–0
 Ryan Day 2–0 Peter Ebdon → (132)-0, (60) 66–51
 Ding Junhui 2–1 Stephen Hendry → 80–47, 32–71 (60), 64–43
 Ryan Day 2–0 Mark Allen → 53–52, 62–21
 Peter Ebdon 1–2 Li Hang → (55) 66–14, 44–68, 17–92
 Ding Junhui 2–1 Mark Allen → (52) 92–45, (53) 60–70, (78) 92–26
 Ryan Day 1–2 Li Hang → 69–13, 8-(77), 16-(62)
 Peter Ebdon 1–2 Stephen Hendry → 64–16, 9–73 (64), 28–66
 Ryan Day 2–1 Stephen Hendry → (68)-0, 14-(102), (76)-1
 Ding Junhui 2–1 Peter Ebdon → 49–70 (52), 70–46, 70–47
 Mark Allen 2–0 Li Hang → 79–44, (52) 68–49
 Stephen Hendry 2–0 Li Hang → 94–21, 71–7
 Mark Allen 2–0 Peter Ebdon → 78–73, 86–32
 Ding Junhui 2–0 Ryan Day → 65–16, 53–35

Group 2

(breaks above 50 shown between brackets)breaks 100 and above will be indicated bold.

 Shaun Murphy 2–0 Jin Long → 54–52, (114)-6
 Joe Perry 0–2 Marco Fu → 60–88, 13–74
 Ali Carter 0–2 Mark Selby → 33–70, 2–124 (92)
 Shaun Murphy 2–0 Marco Fu → 80–0, 72–0
 Ali Carter 2–1 Joe Perry → 0-(99), (56) 96–22, 45–38
 Mark Selby 2–1 Jin Long → 42–102, 68–41, 106–33
 Shaun Murphy 0–2 Joe Perry → 0-(74), 0–80
 Ali Carter 2–1 Jin Long → 1–80, (81) 85–15, 58–52
 Mark Selby 1–2 Marco Fu → 44–100 (58), 74–6, 6–60
 Ali Carter 0–2 Marco Fu → 29–55, 17–86 (81)
 Shaun Murphy 2–0 Mark Selby → 84–29, (52) 85–8
 Joe Perry 2–1 Jin Long → 28–61, 53–44, 64-(54)
 Marco Fu 2–0 Jin Long → (54) 69–29, 54–37
 Joe Perry 2–1 Mark Selby → 0–151 (147), 68–56, (74)-1
 Shaun Murphy 2–1 Ali Carter → 76–63, 26–82 (64), (85) 86–0

Knock-out stages

* 76–51, 0–63, (104) 125–0, (124) 128–1, (97)-0, (72)-0 
** 4–110 (86), 64–55, 25–66 (61), (74) 83–1, 16–78 (72), 4–124 (88), 47–76

Final

Century breaks

 147  Mark Selby
 132  Ryan Day
 124, 117, 104  Ding Junhui
 114  Shaun Murphy
 102  Stephen Hendry

More

2009
Jiangsu Classic
Jiangsu Classic